Paul René Colas (6 May 1880 – 9 September 1956) was a French sport shooter who competed at the 1908, 1912, 1920, and 1924 Summer Olympics.

Between 1908 and 1924 Colas won four Olympic medals: a bronze in 1908, two gold in 1912, and one silver in 1924. Only in 1920 did he fail to win a medal. With his two individual gold medals at the 1912 Games he became the second shooter (a day behind Alfred Lane of the United States) and the first rifle shooter to win two individual Olympic gold medals.

In the 1908 Olympics he also participated in the following events:

 300 metre free rifle - 25th place
 1000 yard free rifle - 28th place

In the 1912 Olympics he also participated in the following events:

 Team free rifle - fourth place
 Team military rifle - fifth place
 300 metre military rifle, three positions - 22nd place

In the 1920 Olympics he also participated in the following events:

 Team free rifle - seventh place
 300 m free rifle, 3 positions - result unknown

References

External links
profile

1880 births
1956 deaths
French male sport shooters
ISSF rifle shooters
Shooters at the 1908 Summer Olympics
Shooters at the 1912 Summer Olympics
Shooters at the 1920 Summer Olympics
Shooters at the 1924 Summer Olympics
Olympic shooters of France
Olympic gold medalists for France
Olympic silver medalists for France
Olympic bronze medalists for France
Olympic medalists in shooting
Medalists at the 1908 Summer Olympics
Medalists at the 1912 Summer Olympics
Medalists at the 1924 Summer Olympics
20th-century French people